Kelfield, Saskatchewan is a small hamlet in central Saskatchewan, Canada.  The hamlet is also the home of the municipal offices for the Rural Municipality of Grandview.

With the arrival of the Canadian Pacific Railway in 1912, this caused some movement of settlement in the area as local settler moved from the old settlement into the new town site, this also saw the establishment of the Kelfield Lumber Company in the town. Between 1915 and 1916 a second sawmill, the Western Canada Sawmill, opened, as well as a hotel, butcher shop and other business establishments.  These early years corresponded to the boom period for the hamlet.

See also 

 List of communities in Saskatchewan
 List of towns in Saskatchewan

References

Former villages in Saskatchewan
Unincorporated communities in Saskatchewan
Grandview No. 349, Saskatchewan
Division No. 13, Saskatchewan